Boris Kaufman (1906–1980) was a Polish cinematographer.

Other people named Boris Kaufman include:

 Boris Kaufman (businessman) (born 1973), Ukrainian businessman
 Boris Kaufman (rabbi), Birobidzhan rabbi